L. Boyer may refer to:

 Louis Boyer (astronomer) (1901–1999), French astronomer
 L. Boyer (cyclist), French cyclist